Pietrasze  (until 1938 ) is a village in the administrative district of Gmina Świętajno of 118 residents, within Olecko County, Warmian-Masurian Voivodeship, in northern Poland.

References

Pietrasze